The Legend of Frank Woods is a 1977 western film.

The Legend of Frank Woods is a re-edited version a 1972 film entitled The Hell You Preach.

Plot
Gunslinger Frank Woods is caught in a shootout and kills three drunks in self-defense. In fear for his life, Woods escapes to the Arizona desert.

References

External links

1977 films
Italian Western (genre) films
American Western (genre) films
1977 Western (genre) films
1970s English-language films
1970s American films
1970s Italian films